Leck may refer to:

Places
 Conwal and Leck, Ireland
 Leck, Lancashire, England 
 Leck, Nordfriesland, Germany
 Leck, Virginia, U.S.

Persons
 Leck (rapper), French rapper of Moroccan origin
 Bart van der Leck (1876–1958), Dutch neoplasticist artist